Albert Thomas may refer to:

Albert Ernest Thomas (1872–1923), Australian politician
Albert Thomas (minister) (1878–1932), French socialist politician, Minister of Armament
Albert Thomas (cricketer) (1893–1965), Welsh cricketer
Albert Thomas (American politician) (1898–1966), American politician
Albert Reuben Edward Thomas (1908–1983), Australian Roman Catholic bishop
Albie Thomas (1935–2013), Australian athlete
Albert Rudolf Thomas (born 1938), Dutch football referee
Albert Sidney Thomas (1873–1967), bishop of the Episcopal Diocese of South Carolina

See also

Albert-Félix-Théophile Thomas (1847–1907), French architect